WLNA is the callsign of an AM radio station licensed to Peekskill, New York and serving the Hudson Valley. The station is owned by Pamal Broadcasting and broadcasts on 1420 kHz at 5,000 watts daytime and 1,000 watts nighttime, both directional, from a five-tower array located just north of Peekskill in the Town of Cortlandt, New York. (The day and night patterns use two different arrays of three towers, with only one tower shared by both arrays.)  Its studios are in Beacon.

History
WLNA signed on-the-air on December 22, 1948, with 500 watts of power daytime only from a single tower located on Radio Terrace in the Town of Cortlandt. It was a full service middle of the road AM station with heavy emphasis on local news and community events. A typical broadcast day had local news at the top and bottom of the hour, farm reports, local weather, and recorded or live music in between.

During the Peekskill Riots on September 4, 1949, WLNA was requested by State Police and City of Peekskill officials to stay on the air past its 6 p.m. sign off time to broadcast emergency information to local residents and persons traveling into the area who may have not been aware of the situation.  The Riots took place near Van Cortlandtville, about 2 miles west of the station.

In 1951 the station increased power to 1,000 watts. In 1958 WLNA-FM 100.7 MHz signed on as a simulcast of the AM station. After sign-off time, WLNA-FM continued on-the-air until about midnight, allowing additional advertising revenue during shortened winter broadcast days.  On October 24, 1971, WLNA-FM changed its call letters to WHUD.  In 1972 the simulcast ended as FM signal split off and launched a beautiful music format from Bonneville.

Throughout the 1970s WLNA continued the full service format.

In 1980, WLNA applied to the Federal Communications Commission for a signal upgrade to 5,000 watts daytime and 1,000 watts night time power.  This would entail moving the transmitter site about 1/2 mile south and putting up a five tower directional antenna array.  The station owners, Highland Broadcasting, battled the Town of Cortlandt zoning board all the way to the New York State Supreme Court over a zoning variance for use of the new transmitter site.  The Supreme Court sided with the radio station, and construction was finished in late 1981.

After the power upgrade, the station's signal never lived up to expectations, and with the decline of AM radio, more resources were put into its sister FM station WHUD.

Highland Broadcasting sold both WLNA and WHUD to Radio Terrace, Inc in 1982. Radio Terrace also owned WROW and WROW-FM in Albany, New York.  Radio Terrace, Inc sold WROW-AM-FM to Albany Broadcasting, predecessor of Pamal Broadcasting in December 1993.  In 1997, WLNA and WHUD were sold Pamal Broadcasting.

Programming
On March 24, 2014, WLNA and WBNR introduced the "Real Country" music format.

On March 15, 2021, WLNA and WBNR changed their format from classic country to a simulcast of classic hits-formatted WBPM.

References

External links

Westchester County, New York
LNA
Radio stations established in 1948
1948 establishments in New York (state)
Pamal Broadcasting
Classic hits radio stations in the United States